Chang Gung Memorial Hospital is a station on the Taoyuan Airport MRT located in Guishan District, Taoyuan City, Taiwan. The station is served by both Commuter and Express services.

Station overview
This elevated station has two island platforms with 4 tracks for Commuter and Express trains. It opened for trial service on 2 February 2017, and for commercial service 2 March 2017.

Land adjacent to the station was developed as a joint development project between government and private enterprises.

History
 2017-03-02: The station opened for commercial service with the opening of the Taipei-Huanbei section of the Airport MRT.

Station layout

Exits
Exit 1: Southeast side of intersection of Wenhua 1st Rd. and Fuxing 1st Rd.

Around the station
Chang Gung Memorial Hospital
Wenxin Elementary School
Da Gang Junior High School

See also
 Taoyuan Metro

References

2017 establishments in Taiwan
Railway stations in Taoyuan City
Railway stations opened in 2017
Taoyuan Airport MRT stations